NEFTA Film Award is award ceremony for Nepali movies organized by Nepal Film Technician Association. The award ceremony is a popular and significant award ceremony in Nepal.

NEFTA has successfully organized 8 award ceremonies and its 9th ceremony is set to be held in Dubai. On its ninth ceremony, NEFTA officially renamed itself as NEFTA International Film Awards.

Awards

The award is given in various categories including Best Film, Best Director, Best Screenplay, Best Actor, Best Actress, Best Supporting Actor, Best Supporting Actress, Best New Actor, Best New Actress and others.

Popular Awards

Best Film
Best Director
Best Screenplay
Best Actor
Best Actress
Best Supporting Actor
Best Supporting Actress
Best New Director
Best New Actor
Best New Actress

Musical Awards
Best Sound Mixing Award
Best Music Arrangement
Best playback singer

Technical Awards

Best Cinematography
Best Editing
Best Art Direction
Best Lighting
Best Music
Best Visual Effects
Best Sound
Best lyrics
Best Recording Engineer
Best Mixing/Mastering Engineer

Special Awards

Kala ratna Award
Appreciation Award
Ethnic film award

References

Nepali film awards
Annual events in Nepal